Michał “Mandzur” Antuszewicz (1 October 1909 — 10 March 1993), was a Polish ice hockey player. He played for Włókniarz Zgierz and Legia Warsaw in Poland, as well as clubs in Manchuria. Antuszewicz also played for the Polish national team the 1952 Winter Olympics. Born in Harbin, China, his father, Romuald, worked for a Russian railway, moving to the region in the wake of the Russo-Japanese War. His mother, Agata, was an economist and translator. Antuszewicz played for local teams in Manchuria, moving to Poland in 1949. He helped Legia win the Polish league championship in both 1951 and 1952. After his playing career he served as a translator for the Polish delegation at the 1964 Summer Olympics in Tokyo.

References

External links

1909 births
1993 deaths
Ice hockey players at the 1952 Winter Olympics
Legia Warsaw (ice hockey) players
Olympic ice hockey players of Poland
Polish ice hockey defencemen
Sportspeople from Harbin
Expatriates from the Russian Empire in China